Ian Uranga Chong (born 22 June 1987 in Durango, Biscay) is a Spanish footballer who plays as a midfielder.

References

External links

1987 births
Living people
People from Durango, Biscay
Spanish people of Macanese descent
Sportspeople from Biscay
Spanish footballers
Footballers from the Basque Country (autonomous community)
Association football midfielders
Segunda División players
Segunda División B players
Tercera División players
Segunda Federación players
Deportivo Alavés B players
Deportivo Alavés players
Barakaldo CF footballers
Real Unión footballers
SD Lemona footballers
Arenas Club de Getxo footballers